KTCJ-LD channel 50 was a digital low-power television station in Minneapolis, Minnesota. Its main affiliation is with the Cornerstone Television network. It broadcasts with a 15 kW signal from its Arden Hills, Minnesota tower, which it shares with sister station KHVM-LD channel 48, a Global Christian Network affiliate, and Daystar Television Network affiliate WDMI-LD channel 62. The station's tower was hit by lightning around Memorial Day 2010, forcing both KHVM-LD and KTCJ-LD to go silent (WDMI converted from analog to digital about the same time). The station has been off air since August, 2017.

References

External links 
 CTVN official site
 EICB website
 RabbitEars.info website
 tvfool.com

Low-power television stations in the United States
Television stations in Minneapolis–Saint Paul